Changfeng Subdistrict is a subdistrict of Chang'an District, Shijiazhuang, Hebei, People's Republic of China, located just within the 2nd Ring Road in the northern part of the city. , it has 9 residential communities and 2 villages under its administration.

See also
List of township-level divisions of Hebei

References

Township-level divisions of Hebei